Cornelius James Ryan (1882 – 27 November 1939) was a publican and member of the Queensland Legislative Assembly.

On 27 February 1911 he married Eileen Florence Casey (died 1952) at Chillagoe and together had two sons and one daughter. He died at Townsville in 1939 and was buried in the Belgian Gardens Cemetery.

Political career
Ryan represented the seat of Eacham for the Labor from 1926 until 1929.

References

Members of the Queensland Legislative Assembly
1882 births
1939 deaths
20th-century Australian politicians